Thornton, New Zealand may refer to:
 Thornton, Bay of Plenty, settlement in the Bay of Plenty
 Thornton, Waikato, suburb of Hamilton

See also
 Thorndon, New Zealand, suburb of Wellington